Russia–Slovakia relations date back to when diplomatic relations were established upon Slovakia gaining its independence on January 1, 1993.  Russia opened its embassy in Bratislava in 1993.  Slovakia also has an embassy in Moscow. Unlike Slovakia's neighbour and close ally Czech Republic, which has some negative view over Russia due to the past, Slovakia tends to have better relations with Russia.

After the 2022 Russian invasion of Ukraine started, Slovakia, as one of the EU countries, imposed sanctions on Russia, and Russia added all EU countries to the list of "unfriendly nations". On 16 February 2023, Slovakia's parliament defined the Putin regime as "terrorist" and formally designated Russia as a state sponsor of terrorism.

See also 

 Foreign relations of Russia
 Foreign relations of Slovakia

Slovak community & Czech community in Russia

References

External links 
 http://www.rusemb.sk/ 
http://fakproject.hu/docs/04-Duleba.pdf

 
Slovakia
Bilateral relations of Slovakia